Mount Haig is located on the border of Alberta and British Columbia on the Continental Divide. It was named in 1862 after Haig, Captain R.W. Mount Haig is the highest peak of Gravenstafel Ridge; its lower north and east faces feature as back country cat skiing for Castle Mountain Resort on neighbouring Gravenstafel Mountain.

Geology

Mount Haig is composed of sedimentary rock laid down during the Precambrian to Jurassic periods. Formed in shallow seas, this sedimentary rock was pushed east and over the top of younger Cretaceous period rock during the Laramide orogeny.

Climate

Based on the Köppen climate classification, Mount Haig is located in a subarctic climate with cold, snowy winters, and mild summers. Winter temperatures can drop below −20 °C with wind chill factors below −30 °C.

See also
List of peaks on the British Columbia–Alberta border

References

External links
 Mount Haig: Mountain-forecast.com

Two-thousanders of Alberta
Two-thousanders of British Columbia
Canadian Rockies